Macroxenodes bartschi is a species of bristly millipede in the family Polyxenidae. It is found in North America.

References

Further reading

 

Polyxenida
Articles created by Qbugbot
Animals described in 1922